Kangleipak is the Meitei language word, or endonym, for the state of Manipur, India.

Kangleipak may also refer to:

 Kangleipak Communist Party, a political party named after Kangleipak, the ancient name of Manipur
 Kangleipak Communist Party (Maoist), a Maoist political party in Manipur
 Kanglei mythology (disambiguation)
 Miss Kangleipak, a female bodybuilding competition